Bealampona is a commune in northern Madagascar. It belongs to the district of Andapa, which is a part of Sava Region. According to 2001 census the population of Bealampona was 11,976.

Primary and junior level secondary education are available in town. It is also a site of industrial-scale  mining. The majority 99% of the population are farmers.  The most important crop is rice, while other important products are coffee, sugarcane and vanilla.  Services provide employment for 1% of the population.

References and notes 

Populated places in Sava Region